PDFVue was an online PDF viewer and editor. Features included viewing, commenting, annotations, page deletion or rotation, and adding fillable form fields to PDFs.  Supported browsers included Internet Explorer, Firefox, and Safari.  PDFs can be uploaded directly, or imported from a web address. The Firefox extension redirects PDFs, enabling viewing and annotation within the browser.

The deskPDF with PDFVue On Ramp release also features "print to PDFVue" functionality, allowing any printable file to be uploaded to PDFVue via the print process, and PostScript technology.

The software has been renamed PDFzen, which was eventually acquired by Philipp Wagner and later merged with Converter.App. The domain name pdfvue.com now points to Converter.App

Features
The primary features included tools for creating and filling out forms, sharing and collaborating on documents, and annotating existing PDFs.

Additional functionality includes the ability to delete and rotate pages within the PDF.

Annotation

The PDFVue Typewriter Tool adds text to a PDF. This allows forms which have been created without fillable fields to be filled out, as well as documents which have been scanned in without OCR. Available annotation tools include:
Typewriter tool
Sticky Notes
Hyperlinks (to other sites, or to pages within the PDF itself)
Drawing tools
Page deletion / rotation

Forms

In addition to being able to fill out forms, PDFVue features tools for creating digital forms.

Current supported fillable form fields include:
Text Fields
Checkboxes
Radio Buttons
List Boxes
Combo Boxes

Sharing
After editing, PDFs can be downloaded locally and can be viewed from any PDF viewer.  PDFVue also allows PDFs to be shared via providing a hyperlink to the hosted PDF, as an alternative to email attachments.  With the annotation tools, this allows collaboration to take place on a single PDF, rather than on multiple versions shared between parties.

Firefox add-on
The Firefox extension renders PDFs using PDFVue's servers, thus avoiding the Acrobat Plug-In freeze-up, as well as Acrobat Reader exploits. When enabled, this extensions traps URL requests on a low level catching PDFs from clicks, redirects, new tabs and the address bar, providing a better level of protection from an unintended PDF launch. Once opened in PDFVue.com, the PDF can be marked up and changes saved. This service is available from Mozilla Add-Ons free of charge.

Print to PDFVue
With the PDFVue OnRamp local documents are automatically uploaded to PDFVue and converted to text searchable PDF's for commenting and sharing.

See also
List of PDF software
Digital signature
Paperless office

Notes

References

External links
Pdfvue Official Website

Cloud applications
Cloud storage
PDF software